The 2006–07 ISU Speed Skating World Cup was a multi-race tournament over a season of speed skating. The season began on 10 November 2006 and lasted until 4 March 2007. The World Cup was organised by the ISU, who also run world cups and championships in short track speed skating and figure skating.

Races

Men

Women

Men's overall results

100 m

Final standings after 4 of 4 races. Oikawa won despite missing the final race due to participation in the 2007 Asian Winter Games; Koskela opted out of the final race, though a place in the final would have won him the World Cup.

500 m

Final standings after 12 of 12 races. The top 15 skaters are listed, as well as those with a top-six placing in a race.

1000 m

Final standings after 10 of 10 races.

1500 m

Final standings after 6 of 6 races.

5000/10000 m

Final standings after 6 of 6 races.

Team pursuit
Final standings after 3 of 3 races.

Women's overall results

100 m
Final standings after 4 of 4 races.

500 m

Final standings after 12 races. The top 15 skaters are listed, as well as those with a top-six placing in a race.

1000 m

Final standings after 10 races.

Many skaters skipped the races in Harbin and Nagano, where nearly 40% of the available points were up for grabs. The overall World Cup winner, Chiara Simionato, was defeated by Anni Friesinger, Ireen Wüst, Christine Nesbitt or Cindy Klassen in all races in which the four took part. Friesinger won four of her five races during the season, taking the most wins.

1500 m

Final standings after 6 races.

Due to winning the final race, Wüst finished ahead of Friesinger, though Friesinger accumulated four wins to Wüst's two during the season.

3000/5000 m

Final standings after 6 races.

Team pursuit
Final standings after 3 races.

References

External links

06-07
ISU Speed Skating World Cup, 2006-07
ISU Speed Skating World Cup, 2006-07